Dicoria can mean:
 Dicoria (plant), a genus of flowering plants in the daisy family
 Having two pupils in the same eye: see polycoria
 An old and now wrong usage for heterochromia iridum (having eyes of different colors)